Ernst Carl Reinhold Brüche (28 March 1900 in Hamburg – 8 February 1985 in Mosbach) was a German physicist.  From 1944 to 1972, he was the editor of the Physikalische Blätter, a publication of the Deutsche Physikalische Gesellschaft.

Education

Brüche studied physics at the Danzig Technische Hochschule from 1919 to 1924.  From 1920, he was a teaching assistant in the physics department.  In 1926 he completed his doctorate under Carl Ramsauer at the Danzig Technische Hochschule.  He completed his Habilitation in 1927.

Career

Until 1933, Brüche was an unpaid lecturer on experimental and technical physics at the Danzig Technische Hochschule, where he worked on the measurement of electron scattering cross-sections of molecular gases.

From 1928 to 1945, he was head of the physics laboratories at the Allgemeine Elektrizitäts-Gesellschaft (AEG) in Reinickendorf, a borough of Berlin.  At the AEG, he worked mostly on geometrical electron optics and developed an electron microscope.  From 1946 to 1951, he was the head scientist of the Süddeutsches Laboratorium, in Mosbach.  From 1948, he was the managing director of Physik-GmbH in Mosbach. After 1951, he was at the Physikalisches Laboratorium in Mosbach.

From 1944 to 1972, Brüche was the founding editor of the Physikalische Blätter.

Awards

1941 – Leibniz Medal
1972 – First recipient of the Max Born-Medaille für Verantwortung in der Wissenschaft

Literature

Ernst Brüche Freie Elektronen als Sonden des Baues von Molekeln, Ergebnisse der exakten Naturwissenschaften 8 185-228 (1929)
Ernst Brüche Die Grundlagen der angewandten geometrischen Elektronenoptik, Electrical Engineering (Archiv für Elektrotechnik) Volume 29, Number 2, 79-107 (1935). The author is cited as being at the Forschungs-institut der AEG, Berlin.  The article was received on 12 August 1934.
Ernst Brüche Zum Entstehen des Elektronenmikroskops,  Physikalische Zeitschrift. 44 176-180 (1943)
 Ernst Brüche Deutsche Physik und die Deutschen Physiker, Neue Physikalische Blätter 2 232-236 (1946)
Ernst Brüche 25 Jahre Elektronenmikroskop, Physikalische Blätter 13 493-500 (1957)

Books

Ernst Brüche Physiker-Anekdoten von Ernst Brüche (Physik-Verl., 1952)
Carl Ramsauer, Rudolf Kollath, und Ernst Brüche Wirkungsquerschnitt der Edelgase gegenüber langsamen Elektronen (Geest & Portig, 1954)
 Theodor Pöschl, Carl Ramsauer, and Ernst Brüche Die Physik in Einzelberichten. H. 1. Mechanik (Barth, 1956)
 Heinz Thiede, Carl Ramsauer, and Ernst Brüche  Die Physik in Einzelberichten. H. 2. Praktische Akustik (Barth, 1957)
Helmut Moser, Helmut Moser, Carl Ramsauer, und Ernst Brüche  Die Physik in Einzelberichten. H. 3. Wärmelehre?1. Mit Beitr von Helmut Moser. (Barth, 1957)
Ernst Brüche Aus dem Leben eines Physikers (Mosbach, Baden, 1971)

Bibliography

Hentschel, Klaus, editor and Ann M. Hentschel, editorial assistant and Translator Physics and National Socialism: An Anthology of Primary Sources (Birkhäuser, 1996) 
Hentschel, Klaus with Ann M. Hentschel as translator The Mental Aftermath: The Mentality of German Physicists 1945 – 1949 (Oxford, 2007)  (To a significant extent, Hentschel draws from Brüche’s diary, which is among Ernst Brüche’s papers at the Landesmuseum für Technik in Mannheim.)

References

1900 births
1985 deaths
20th-century German physicists
Officers Crosses of the Order of Merit of the Federal Republic of Germany